Geoffrey William Vanderfeen (25 February 1930 – 4 April 2016) is  a former Australian rules footballer who played with Footscray in the Victorian Football League (VFL).

Notes

External links 
		

2016 deaths
1930 births
Australian rules footballers from Victoria (Australia)
Western Bulldogs players
Yarraville Football Club players